A by-election was held for the Australian House of Representatives seat of Dalley on 26 February 1927. This was triggered by the resignation of Labor MP William Mahony.

The by-election was won by former Queensland Premier Ted Theodore, the Labor candidate. After the by-election there was some suggestion that Theodore had bribed Mahony to resign so that he might enter Parliament.

Results

See also
Electoral results for the Division of Dalley
List of Australian federal by-elections

References

1927 elections in Australia
New South Wales federal by-elections
1920s in New South Wales